Ville Sorvali (born 13 April 1980 in Helsinki, Finland) is a Finnish musician and music journalist. He is the vocalist, bass guitarist and lyricist for the Finnish pagan metal band Moonsorrow. His cousin Henri "Trollhorn" Sorvali is the guitarist and main songwriter.

He is currently playing in the bands Daimonic, Human Death, and Lakupaavi. Other bands he has played in include Amoral and May Withers. His idols include Alan Averill of Irish band Primordial, and Thomas Väänänen of Swedish band Thyrfing.

References 

1980 births
Living people
Finnish heavy metal bass guitarists
Finnish journalists
21st-century Finnish male singers
Musicians from Helsinki
Male bass guitarists
21st-century bass guitarists